The Marvin E. Goody Memorial by Joan Goody is installed in Boston's Public Garden, in the U.S. state of Massachusetts. The red granite and Dakota mahogany memorial was dedicated in 1984, having been funded by Friends of the Public Garden and Common. It was surveyed as part of the Smithsonian Institution's "Save Outdoor Sculpture!" program in 1993.

References

External links

 Marvin E. Goody Memorial, 1984 at cultureNOW

1984 establishments in Massachusetts
Boston Public Garden
Monuments and memorials in Boston
Outdoor sculptures in Boston